Bird Island is a small island between Point Bonita and Rodeo Cove in southern Marin County, California.  It is located off the coast of Marin Headlands, about three miles from San Francisco.

See also
Bird Rock (Marin County, California)
List of islands of California

References

Islands of Marin County, California
Islands of the San Francisco Bay Area
Islands of Northern California
Uninhabited islands of California
Pacific islands of California